In quantum mechanics, given a particular Hamiltonian  and an operator  with corresponding eigenvalues and eigenvectors given by ,  the  are said to be  good quantum numbers if every eigenvector  remains an eigenvector of  with the same eigenvalue as time evolves.

In other words, the eigenvalues  are good quantum numbers if the corresponding operator  is a constant of motion. Good quantum numbers are often used to label initial and final states in experiments. For example, in particle colliders:

1. Particles are initially prepared in approximate momentum eigenstates; the particle momentum being a good quantum number for non-interacting particles.

2. The particles are made to collide. At this point, the momentum of each particle is undergoing change and thus the particles’ momenta are not a good quantum number for the interacting particles during the collision.

3. A significant time after the collision, particles are measured in momentum eigenstates. Momentum of each particle has stabilized and is again a good quantum number a long time after the collision.

A proof of this theorem is given below. Note that the theorem holds even if the spectrum is continuous; the proof is slightly more difficult (but no more illuminating) in that case.

Proof for Discrete Spectrum 
We will work in the Heisenberg picture. Let  be a hermitian operator and let  be a complete, orthonormal basis of eigenstates with eigenvalues . The main observation behind the proof is

Ehrenfest Theorem and Good Quantum Numbers 
The Ehrenfest Theorem gives the rate of change of the expectation value of operators. It reads as follows:

Commonly occurring operators don't depend explicitly on time. If such operators commute with the Hamiltonian, then their expectation value remains constant with time. Now, if the system is in one of the common eigenstates of the operator (and  too), then the system remains in this eigenstate as time progresses. Any measurement of the quantity  will give us the eigenvalue (or the good quantum number) associated with the eigenstates in which the particle is. This is actually a statement of conservation in quantum mechanics, and will be elaborated in more detail below.

Conservation in Quantum Mechanics

Let  be an operator which commutes with the Hamiltonian . Assume that our system is in one of these common eigenstates. Also, it is a well-known result that an eigenstate of the Hamiltonian is a stationary state, which means that even if the system is left to evolve for some time before the measurement is made, it will still yield the same eigenvalue. Therefore, If our system is in a common eigenstate, its eigenvalues of A (good quantum numbers) won't change with time.

As assumed in case I, . In this case, a (weaker) statement of conservation holds: Using the Ehrenfest Theorem,   doesn't explicitly depend on time:  

This says that the expectation value of  remains constant in time. When the measurement is made on identical systems again and again, it will generally yield different values, but the expectation value remains constant.

Analogy with Classical Mechanics

In classical mechanics, the total time derivative of a physical quantity  is given as:

This bears a striking resemblance to the  Ehrenfest Theorem. It implies that a physical quantity  is conserved if its Poisson Bracket with the Hamiltonian vanishes and the quantity does not depend on time explicitly. This condition in classical mechanics is analogous to the condition in quantum mechanics for the conservation of an observable (as implied by Ehrenfest Theorem: Poisson bracket is replaced by commutator)

Systems which can be labelled by good quantum numbers

Systems which can be labelled by good quantum numbers are actually eigenstates of the Hamiltonian. They are also called stationary states. They are so called because the system remains in the same state as time elapses, in every observable way. The states changes mathematically, since the complex phase factor attached to it changes continuously with time, but it can't be observed.

Such a state satisfies:
,
where
 is a quantum state, which is a stationary state;
 is the Hamiltonian operator;
 is the energy eigenvalue of the state .

The evolution of the state ket is governed by the Schrödinger Equation:

It gives the time evolution of the state of the system as:

Examples

The hydrogen atom 

The hydrogen atom: no spin-orbit coupling

In the case of the hydrogen atom (with the assumption that there is no spin-orbit coupling), the observables that commute with Hamiltonian are the orbital angular momentum, spin angular momentum, the sum of the spin angular momentum and orbital angular momentum, and the  components of the above angular momenta. We have omitted , since it always is constant for an electron and carries no significance as far the labeling of states is concerned.

Good quantum numbers and CSCO

However, all the good quantum numbers in the above case of the hydrogen atom (with negligible spin-orbit coupling), namely  can't be used simultaneously to specify a state. Here is when CSCO (Complete set of commuting observables) comes into play. Here are some general results which are of general validity :

1. A certain number of good quantum numbers can be used to specify uniquely a certain quantum state only when the observables corresponding to the good quantum numbers form a CSCO.

2. If the observables commute, but don't form a CSCO, then their good quantum numbers refer to a set of states. In this case they don't refer to a state uniquely.

3. If the observables don't commute they can't even be used to refer to any set of states, let alone refer to any unique state.

In the case of hydrogen atom, the  don't form a commuting set. But  are the quantum numbers of a CSCO. So, are in this case, they form a set of good quantum numbers. Similarly,   too form a set of good quantum numbers.

The hydrogen atom: spin-orbit interaction included

If the spin orbit interaction is taken into account, we have to add an extra term in Hamiltonian which represents the magnetic dipole interaction energy.

In other words,  are no longer good quantum numbers, but  are.

And since, good quantum numbers are used to label the eigenstates, the relevant formulae of interest are expressed in terms of them. For example, the spin-orbit interaction energy is given by

where

As we can see, the above expressions contain the good quantum numbers, namely

See also
 Complete set of commuting observables
 Hamiltonian (quantum mechanics)
 Stationary state
 Constant of motion
 Quantum number
 Measurement in quantum mechanics
 Ehrenfest theorem
 Operator (physics)

References

Quantum mechanics